Vivek Sachidanand is an Indian sound designer, sound mixer and recordist.

Early life and education
Vivek studied audiography from the Film and Television Institute of India (FTII), Pune (2000–2003). Vivek had a passion for music from early on and he studied classical music and taught himself to play a variety of musical instruments.

Career
He began a serious pursuit of his interests in music and sound when he joined the FTII at Pune. There his ideas on the use of sound as a means of story telling, and not merely as a background prop, took shape. He won the Indian National Film Award for the film Ksha Tra Gya(Best Audiography 2005) where he demonstrated his innovative and occasionally iconoclastic approach to sound design.
After leaving FTII he trained with renowned Sound Designers P M Satheesh and Academy Award winner Resul Pookutty and developed his own style of sound mixing and design. From there he went on to found Hashtone Post Sound with an idea of exploring new and uncharted avenues of sound in filmmaking and otherwise. Since then he has been involved in a number of successful Indian and internationally acclaimed projects.

Filmography

References

External links
 
 http://godlivesinthehimalayas.com/

1981 births
Living people
Indian sound designers
Film and Television Institute of India alumni
Musicians from Thrissur
Film musicians from Kerala